Beach sepak takraw at the 2010 Asian Beach Games was held from 9 December to 16 December 2010 in Muscat, Oman.

Medalists

Medal table

Results

Men's regu

Preliminary round

Group A

Group B

Knockout round

Men's team regu

Preliminary

Group A

Group B

Knockout round
11 December

Women's regu

Women's team regu

References
 Official site

2010 Asian Beach Games events
2010